Their First Misunderstanding is a 1911 American short silent drama film directed by Thomas H. Ince and starring Mary Pickford and Owen Moore. Pickford and Moore married on January 7, 1911.

Cast
 Mary Pickford as Mae Darcy
 Owen Moore as Tom Owen
 Thomas H. Ince in crowd at train station
 Ben Turpin in crowd at train station

Preservation status
Their First Misunderstanding was believed to be a lost film until a copy was discovered in a barn in New Hampshire in 2006. The film is intact, apart from the first minute, which had disintegrated over time. The remaining footage was restored and is currently preserved at the Library of Congress and the Keene State College Film Society.

See also
 Mary Pickford filmography
 Thomas H. Ince filmography
 List of incomplete or partially lost films
 List of rediscovered films

References

External links
 

1911 films
1911 drama films
1911 short films
1910s rediscovered films
Silent American drama films
American silent short films
American black-and-white films
Films directed by Thomas H. Ince
Independent Moving Pictures films
Films produced by Carl Laemmle
Rediscovered American films
1910s American films